Jeitler is a surname. Notable people with the surname include:

Georg H. Jeitler (born 1979), Austrian entrepreneur and forensic scientist
Carmen Jeitler-Cincelli (born 1980), Austrian entrepreneur and politician

See also
Zeitler